The women's individual archery event at the 2015 Pan American Games was held from 14 to 18 July 2015 at the Varsity Stadium in Toronto, Canada. One of five archery events as part of the 2015 Pan American sporting programme, it was the tenth time the women's individual recurve competition had been contested at the Games. Thirty-two archers from thirteen nations qualified for the event.

The defending champion from the 2011 Pan American Games was Alejandra Valencia of Mexico. As she had achieved four years previously, Valencia was seeded first following the 72-arrow ranking round but was unexpectedly defeated by Colombia's Maira Sepulveda in the 1/8 elimination round. Five-time Olympic athlete Khatuna Lorig of the United States emerged as champion, defeating Colombia's Ana Rendón in the final in four sets to take her first Pan American gold medal. Valencia's Mexican teammates Aída Román and Karla Hinojosa contested the bronze medal match, Hinojosa defeating the 2012 Olympic silver medalist to take third place.

Background

An individual archery event for women has been a part of the Pan American Games programme since the sport's debut in 1979 in San Juan, Puerto Rico. The United States was the dominant nation in terms of gold medals won in the event, and at the previous Pan American Games held in 2011 in Guadalajara, Mexico, Alejandra Valencia became the second archer from outside the United States to win the women's individual gold medal, following Yaremis Pérez Ruiz of Cuba in 1999. Valencia's victory over the American Miranda Leek four years previously also marked the first Mexican win in a Pan American archery event. Her compatriot Aída Román won the bronze medal ahead of Venezuela's Leidys Brito.

Qualification

There were thirty-two places available for the women's individual event, with the host nation Canada automatically receiving three spots. Qualification for the remaining twenty-nine positions took place over three tournaments: the Pan American Olympic Festival held in July 2014, the Pan American Championships in October 2014, and a final qualification round in March 2015. Eight nations (Argentina, Brazil, Chile, Colombia, Cuba, Mexico, the United States, and Venezuela) also successfully qualified the maximum berth of three archers, with the Dominican Republic qualifying two and Costa Rica, El Salvador, and Guatemala qualifying one archer apiece.

Mexico selected the defending bronze medalist from the 2015 Pan American Games, and silver medalist from the 2012 Summer Olympics, Aída Román to spearhead their three-member team, with defending champion Alejandra Valencia and Karla Hinojosa rounding out the squad. The United States entered a team of mixed experience, pairing five-time Olympian Khatuna Lorig alongside Ariel Gibilaro and La Nola Pritchard, who both made their Pan American Games debut. The head of the United States national archery organisation Denise Parker, herself the 1987 and 1991 Pan American Games individual women's champion, said 2015 represented a "season of change" in the United States archery team with the selection of newcomers in both the women's and men's teams. She however pointed to the a bronze medal won at the 2015 Archery World Cup stage held in Shanghai in May as proof of the women's potential for success.

Georcy-Stéphanie Picard and Virginie Chénier were selected as part of the Canadian team after finishing first and second in the Canadian national trials, partnering Kateri Vrakking who finished third. The 41-year old Vrakking, a five-time national champion, had been initially passed over as Canada's third entry with Archery Canada, the national archery organisation, instead selecting as their third representative nineteen year-old Shannon Davidson, who had finished fifth in the national trials. Following accusations of age discrimination, which Archery Canada denied, and threats of legal action, Davidson's selection was reversed and Vrakking was named to the team.

Yesenia Valencia was chosen to represent Guatemala at their maiden appearance at a Pan American Games women's archery event, having won a position in the final qualification round in March 2015.

Format

Schedule

Report

Pre-event
Prior to the beginning of the competition, Mexican sports newspaper Esto reported that reigning champion Alejandra Valencia expressed doubts that she would retain her title to become the first back-to-back Pan American female individual archery champion. Valencia stated instead that her target was simply to perform well and beat her own personal records. In preparation for the Games, the Mexican archery squad had pitted the women's team of Valencia, Aída Román and Karla Hinojosa against the men's team of Juan René Serrano, Luis Álvarez and Ernesto Boardman and held practice rounds in the rain. Román, who had been named by Mexican news agency Notimex as the world's best archer of 2014, aimed to improve on her bronze medal achievement in Guadalajara four years earlier.

Ranking round
The event commenced with the ranking round on the morning of 14 July amid spells of light rain and gusts of wind. Alejandra Valencia topped the ranking round for the second Pan American Games in a row, heading the table on 655 points. Fellow Mexican Aída Román finished in second with an identical score of 655 points, but was seeded second after shooting one fewer arrow inside the central 10 ring. Khatuna Lorig and Karla Hinojosa both tied on 651 points to rank third and fourth respectively.

Kateri Vrakking was the highest scoring Canadian archer, finishing with the 14th seed on 612 points.  Vrakking's teammates Georcy-Stéphanie Picard and Virginie Chenier were not far behind, ending the round 15th and 18th respectively and setting up an all-Canadian tie in the first elimination round. Vrakking expressed satisfaction with her performance, stating she was feeling confident ahead of the knock-out rounds after finding her rhythm. She added that she was unperturbed by the intermittent drizzle or the home crowd in attendance, which Justin Skinner of the Toronto newspaper The City Centre Mirror described as "sizeable" despite the weather.

Elimination rounds

Cool and windy conditions continued into the morning of 15 July, which proved challenging for many of the archers. Khatuna Lorig began by defeating Elena Abullerade in the opening round, ending El Salvador's participation in the event. Argentina's trio of Ximena Mendiberry, Fernanda Faisal, and Florencia Lenhold Juárez were all also eliminated in the first round. In the all-Canadian affair between Picard and Chenier, Picard came back from two sets down to force and ultimately win the subsequent one-arrow shoot-off, placing her arrow in the 8-ring to Chenier's attempt in the 7-ring. As the two both belonged to the same archery club and shared the same coach, Chenier described the match as "like training, but with a little more people and more nervousness". Despite her loss, Chenier expressed satisfaction with her shooting, and the pair's coach Sylvain Cadieux praised their performances, saying they each knew what to expect from one another and that he was pleased that the match came down to a shoot-off.

The 1/8 elimination round, the second knock-out round of the competition, began with top seed Valencia losing in five sets to Colombia's Maira Sepulveda, who finished 16th in the ranking round, while Valencia's Mexican teammates Román and Hinojoa defeated Picard and Sarah Nikitin of Brazil respectively to advance to the quarter-finals. Picard said afterwards that she felt she had played better than in her earlier match against Chenier, but was unable to fully master the gusts of winds that pushed her arrows towards the right, bowing out of the tournament to Román in straight sets. Román admitted that it took time for her to adapt to the 14 °C air temperature, but was able to play her best towards the end of the day's session, which concluded with the quarter-finals at 11am. Román defeated Cuba's Maydenia Sarduy to progress to the semi-finals to face Khatuna Lorig, while Hinojosa beat Colombia's Natalia Sanchez to face off against Sanchez's compatriot Ana Rendón in the other last four contest, a result that exceeded her own expectations.

The final rounds of the competition began three days later on the morning of 18 July with the two semi-final matches. In the first match Rendón was too strong for Hinojosa, the Mexican failing to land an arrow in the target's central 10 ring as the Colombian won in straight sets to advance to the final. She was joined in the gold medal match by Lorig, whose match with Román was a tight affair which necessitated a one-arrow shoot-off after the two could not be split after five sets. Lorig's winning shot was determined to be closer to the centre of the target by a matter of centimetres and was thus declared the winner. Notimex described the result as a "bitter déjà vu" for Román, who had experienced a loss in similar circumstances in the final of the women's individual event at the 2012 Summer Olympics against South Korea's Ki Bo-bae, in which Román finished with the silver medal.

Medal matches

The matches determining the medal winners commenced immediately after the semi-final encounters. As the two losing archers from the semi-finals, Hinojosa and Román met to decide the bronze medal match. Hinojosa's win over Román in five sets was considered a surprise by Notimex, and Esto characterised the encounter as an apprentice winning against a master in their report of the match, highlighting that Hinojosa on her Pan American Games debut overcame her vastly more experienced and Olympic medalist teammate. In an interview following the match Hinojosa dedicated her bronze medal victory to her parents and her friends and set her sights on securing a spot for the 2015 World Archery Championships. She also expressed her admiration for Román, stating that defeating Román gave her motivation to put in more effort, "because Aída will never give up."

In the gold medal final Lorig won comfortably over Rendón, earning the United States their first and only archery title at the 2015 Games. Nick Butler of Inside the Games called her win "the biggest of her illustrious career", which came on a day that saw a flurry of gold medals for the United States and helped them topple Canada from the head of the Pan American Games medal table. Rendon's silver medal was the eighth achieved by Colombia at the 2015 Pan American Games and her second after her gold medal victory in the women's team event.

Results

Ranking round

Elimination rounds

Top half

Bottom half

Note: An asterisk (*) denotes a win from a one-arrow shoot-off  
Source:

Finals

Note: An asterisk (*) denotes a win from a one-arrow shoot-off 
Source:

See also
Archery at the 2014 Asian Games – Women's individual recurve
Archery at the 2015 European Games – Women's individual
Archery at the 2016 Summer Olympics – Women's individual

Notes

References

External links
Archery at the Official Toronto 2015 website (archived)
Highlights of the medal matches on YouTube from World Archery

Archery at the 2015 Pan American Games
2015 in women's archery